Road to the Horse is an annual colt-starting competition held at the Alltech Arena in the Kentucky Horse Park in Lexington, Kentucky. Three trainers are invited to choose a colt from a remuda of untouched three-year old Quarter Horses provided by the American Quarter Horse Association. They then have a specified amount of time over three days to gently get a saddle and tack on the colt and ride it. Road to the Horse is owned and produced by Tootie Bland. In the past the competition has been held in the Cowtown Coliseum in Fort Worth, Texas and Murfreesboro, Tennessee.

Winners

References

Equestrian sports competitions in the United States